The Wedding Video is a mockumentary film in the genre of gay and lesbian comedy, starring, directed, and written by Norman Korpi. Filmed in 1998 and completed in 2001 it was not released until 2003 by TLA Video.

The film stars a variety of alum from various seasons of the reality television show The Real World. Within the context of the film they ostensibly play themselves; however their "characters" (as perceived by viewers of The Real World) are exaggerated and various facts about their backgrounds and relationships with one another are altered or made fictional. In fact The Real World is never mentioned.

Plot
The film centers around Norman, who is soon to marry his boyfriend Sky (Perry). Norm's parents do not approve of this, but give him $10,000 to use for the wedding. With this money, he hires Clint (Cowen), a professional wedding video director. He sends Clint out to videotape some of his best friends. This includes Julie (Oliver), a naive country girl who is surprised to find out Norman is gay; and Heather (B.), a street-wise, egocentric African American woman who doesn't really care either way. The three were once roommates in New York City; they lived on Gay Street.

Other guests include Norm's Minnesotan lumberjack cousin Sean (Duffy) and his conservative-but-open-minded wife Rachel (Campos) who is eight months pregnant, promiscuous stripper Cory (Murphy), Norm's college buddy Syrus (Yarbrough), and opinionated eurotrash DJ Lars (Schlichting). The group ultimately converge in Norm's castle in Los Angeles where pre-wedding festivities unfold.

Crises unfold when the wedding planner Norm has hired discovers he is gay and backs out; when her assistant secretly continues the gig, the planner cancels all of their catering and florists. Additionally it becomes evident to everyone at the wedding that Sky has a female mistress; Cory reveals that Sky is also a gay porn star.

Ultimately, the wedding goes off mostly without a hitch (thanks in part to Norman's obliviousness because he took ecstasy), and Clint edits the video down into a charming (if false) portrayal of a happy wedding.

References

External links 
 

2003 films
American mockumentary films
2000s English-language films
Films about weddings
2000s mockumentary films
2003 comedy films
2000s American films